Yanis Moloud Rahmani Cordeiro (born 13 May 1995) is a French footballer who plays for Spanish club SD Eibar as a left winger.

Club career
Born in Champigny-sur-Marne to an Algerian father and a Portuguese mother, Rahmani moved to Sestao at the age of eight and joined Athletic Bilbao's youth setup in 2005, aged ten. He made his senior debut with the farm team in the 2012–13 season, in Tercera División.

In August 2014, after finishing his formation, Rahmani was loaned to Segunda División B side Sestao River Club, for one year. He subsequently served further loan stints at CD Tudelano, SD Leioa and again back to Sestao before leaving Athletic when his contract expired in 2017.

On 26 June 2017, Rahmani signed a two-year contract with CD Mirandés, still in the third division. On 3 July 2019, he agreed to a two-year deal with UD Almería in Segunda División.

Rahmani made his professional debut on 17 August 2019, coming on as a late substitute for Gaspar in a 3–0 home defeat of Albacete Balompié. On 2 September, however, he and fellow teammate Mathieu Peybernes were loaned to CD Lugo for the season.

Rahmani scored his first professional goal on 9 February 2020, netting the opener in a 2–2 home draw against Elche CF. On 1 September, he moved to fellow league team Málaga CF on loan for the season.

On 30 July 2021, Rahmani agreed to a four-year contract with SD Eibar, also in the second division.

Career statistics

References

External links

1995 births
Living people
People from Champigny-sur-Marne
French sportspeople of Algerian descent
French people of Portuguese descent
French footballers
Footballers from the Basque Country (autonomous community)
Sportspeople from Biscay
Association football wingers
Segunda División players
Segunda División B players
Tercera División players
CD Basconia footballers
Sestao River footballers
CD Tudelano footballers
SD Leioa players
CD Mirandés footballers
UD Almería players
CD Lugo players
Málaga CF players
SD Eibar footballers
French expatriate footballers
French expatriate sportspeople in Spain
Expatriate footballers in Spain
Athletic Bilbao footballers